Tony Spinner (born June 9, 1963) is an American rock and blues singer and guitarist, best known for his collaborations with Toto and Paul Gilbert. Spinner, who toured with Toto from 1999 until their temporary hiatus in 2008, was personally selected by David Paich as a backup guitarist and backing vocalist and would perform lead vocals on the song "Stop Loving You," originally performed by former Toto member Joseph Williams. When Toto reformed in 2010, Williams rejoined the band. 

In fall 2010, Tony Spinner joined Paul Gilbert on his "Fuzz Universe" European tour.

Tony Spinner discography
1993: Saturn Blues - (solo)
1993: Various Artists – L.A. Blues Authority: Hats off to Stevie Ray (L.A. Blues Authority Volume III) - "Empty Arms"
1993: Various Artists – L.A. Blues Authority: Fit For A. King (L.A. Blues Authority Volume IV) - "Down Don't Bother Me"
1994: Various Artists – Songs from the Better Blues Bureau - "Angeline"
1994: My. '64 - (solo)
1995: Let It Be Known - Mark Sallings & Famous Unknowns
1996: Crosstown Sessions - (solo)
1997: Talkin' to Myself - Mark Sallings & Famous Unknowns
1998: Flying Dog - (Paul Gilbert)
1999: Livefields - (Toto)
2000: Alligator Farm - (Paul Gilbert)
2003: Various Artists – Voodoo Crossing: A Tribute to Jimi Hendrix - "Up From The Skies"
2003: Live in Amsterdam - (Toto)
2004: Chicks And Guitars - (solo)
2007: Falling in Between Live - (Toto)
2008: Live in Europe - (solo)
2009: Rollin´and Tumblin' - (solo)
2010: Fuzz Universe - (Paul Gilbert)
2011: Rare Tracks - (solo)
2011: Down Home Mojo - (solo)
2012: Vibrato - (Paul Gilbert)
2013: Earth Music for Aliens - (solo)
2016: I Can Destroy - (Paul Gilbert)

References

External links
 Tony Spinner's biography on his official website
 Toto web page on Toto99
 Tony Spinner's profile and discography on Discogs 
 Tony Spinner's discography

American rock singers
American rock guitarists
American male guitarists
Living people
1963 births
20th-century American guitarists
20th-century American male musicians
21st-century American guitarists
21st-century American male musicians